Ray Danniels is a Canadian music executive, record producer, and talent manager.  He's the founder of SRO (Standing Room Only) Management group, as well as independent record labels Moon Records and Anthem Records.  He first rose to prominence as the manager of the Canadian band Rush and later served as the manager of Extreme, King's X, and Van Halen. His sister-in-law Kelly Carter was married to Alex Van Halen.

He was awarded the Walt Grealis Special Achievement Award at the 2015 Juno Awards.

References

External links 
Anthem Entertainment Group and SRO Management

Canadian record producers
Canadian music managers
Living people
Year of birth missing (living people)
Anthem Records
Rush (band)
Van Halen